"Love Don't Cost a Thing" is a song by American singer Jennifer Lopez for her second studio album J.Lo (2001). It was released on November 20, 2000, by Epic Records as the lead single from the album. The song was written by Damon Sharpe, Greg Lawson, Georgette Franklin, Jeremy Monroe and Amille D. Harris, and produced by Ric Wake, Richie Jones and Cory Rooney. At the time of the song's release, Lopez was transitioning into a sex symbol and in a relationship with American rapper Sean Combs. Lyrically, "Love Don't Cost a Thing" is described as an "exploration of love" in which Lopez is unhappy about her materialistic lover; provoking much media analysis as to whether or not it was an innuendo towards Combs. Ultimately, the pair's courtship ended shortly after its release. Described as "frothy" and "catchy" by critics, it was noted for its message about love and commercial appeal to women.

"Love Don't Cost a Thing" was met with worldwide commercial success and is considered "classic Lopez". It peaked within the top ten in the United States and foreign markets including Australia, France, Germany and Ireland, as well as peaking at number one in Canada, New Zealand and the United Kingdom, among other countries. "Love Don't Cost a Thing" was also a radio hit, becoming her first single to top the Billboard Hot 100 Airplay chart. The music video for "Love Don't Cost a Thing" directed by Paul Hunter and choreographed by Darrin Dewitt Henson was met with acclaim, garnering MTV Video Music Award and ALMA Award nominations. It became one of the year's most-viewed clips, and was highly requested on the music video broadcasting series, Total Request Live. The music video subsequently became notorious after Lopez married Cris Judd, one of the back-up dancers who appeared in it. Lopez has performed "Love Don't Cost a Thing" live on numerous occasions, including the 2000 MTV Europe Music Awards and the 2001 MTV Video Music Awards in New York City.

Background and release
After a high-profile title role in the musical biopic Selena (1997), Lopez began developing her own career in music, later being signed to Work Records by Tommy Mottola. Her debut album entitled On the 6 (1999) became an instant commercial success, and spawned the Billboard Hot 100 number one song "If You Had My Love". This led her to begin recording new material for her second album in April 2000. Initially, the album was to be called A Passionate Journey. During this period, Lopez began to transition into a sex symbol and was nicknamed J.Lo by the public, which is known as a nickname and "public persona". Hence, she instead released an album entitled J.Lo, which she credits as being more "personal" and "romantic" than On the 6. "Love Don't Cost a Thing" was globally premiered on November 16, 2000. The single began impacting US radio from mid-December. "Love Don't Cost a Thing" was included on Lopez's greatest hits album, Dance Again... the Hits, which was released on July 24, 2012.

Writing and production 
In July 2000, Lawson came up with an idea for a song he thought would be ideal for Lopez. He recalled: "I wrote and recorded a track which eventually turned out to be 'Love Don't Cost a Thing'. I called Damon up, and I played the track and sang the melody to him over the phone. We ended up collaborating on the song, with both of us writing parts of the melody and the lyric. I came up with the title, and he came up with the key line, 'Even if you were broke,' in the chorus. Three other writers, Georgette Franklin, Jeremy Munroe and Amil Harris, also contributed parts to the song." In August, after a demo for "Love Don't Cost a Thing" had been recorded, Sharpe sent a CD of the song to Wake at his studio in New York. Wake, who loved the song, played it for Lopez, who also loved it. Not soon after, the master recording of "Love Don't Cost a Thing" was cut at Sony Studios in New York City.

Composition and lyrical interpretation 

"Love Don't Cost a Thing" is a pop and R&B song with a running time of three minutes and forty-two seconds (3:42). It was primarily produced by Ric Wake, with additional production from Cory Rooney and Richie Jones. Lopez recorded her vocals for the song with Dan Hetzel and Dave Scheyer at the Cove City Sound Studios in Glen Cove, New York, which were mixed by Jones and Hetzel. Later, the song was mastered by Ted Jensen at Sterling Sound in New York. According to MTV News, "Love Don't Cost a Thing" carries on Lopez' exploration of love in her music from her first single, "If You Had My Love". Additionally, the track details the "inner workings of love". Lyrically, it is the "tale of a materialistic relationship" which is full of "credit cards and lavish gifts"; Lopez sings in the chorus: "Think you gonna keep me iced, you don't/ Think I'm gonna spend your cash, I won't/ Even if you were broke/ My love don't cost a thing." She also states that she is "not impressed" by her lover's Mercedes-Benz because "she's got her own".

It has been reported by multiple sources that the lyrical message of "Love Don't Cost a Thing" was based around her two-year relationship with rapper Sean Combs, who allegedly "showered" her with expensive jewelry. Shortly after the month's release, they broke up. During their courtship, they were considered "hip-hop's most prominent couple". Cheryl Lu-Lien Tan of The Baltimore Sun speculated that materialism was the reason for their break-up, using Combs' signature hit "It's All About the Benjamins" vs. "Love Don't Cost a Thing" as an example.

Critical reception 
Entertainment Weeklys Marc Weingarten noted the song to be a "standard fare, booty thump funk, with a snapping snare and a female chorus of yes gals" but praised its "bold message", "'Love Don't Cost a Thing,' is a sharp rebuke to all of those male hip hoppers who kvetch about their women going for the bling bling". Slant Magazine's Sal Cinquemani called the song a "cheap carbon copy" of producer Rodney Jerkins' "style of frothy R&B." In a review of its parent album, a reviewer from the Toronto Star said Lopez is best on "fun" "r 'n' b-ish, uptempo tracks" such as "Love Don't Cost a Thing" where "the catchy hooks and thumping bass do most of the work."

A writer from the website Crosswalk noted it to be a "fun dance song" and said, "This song, with its addictive beat and familiar vocal riffs, has a bunch of young girls singing 'even if you were broke, my love don't cost a thing.'" Stephen Thomas Erlewine of AllMusic called it "ingratiating", while Bill Lamb of About.com called it a "frothy pop confection" which he felt was "strongly influenced by the hits of Destiny's Child".

Chart performance 
"Love Don't Cost a Thing" experienced commercial success worldwide, and is considered one of Lopez' biggest hits; it was especially noted for its popularity on pop radio. For the week ending December 9, 2000, "Love Don't Cost a Thing" made its debut at number 46 on the US Billboard Hot 100, winning the "Hot Shot Debut" of the week award. Its second week saw it climb eighteen positions to number 28, followed by a jump to number 22 the next week. Weeks later, "Love Don't Cost a Thing" entered the chart's top ten, significantly jumping from number ten to four during the week ending January 27, 2001, as well as rising to number three on the US Billboard Hot 100 Airplay chart. Though the song began to fall on the Hot 100, it managed to peak at number one on the US Billboard Mainstream Top 40 Pop Songs chart. However, by the week ending February 24, 2001, "Love Don't Cost a Thing" peaked at number three on the Hot 100 after slowly rising in the two weeks prior; it also peaked atop the Hot 100 Airplay Chart. Despite this, the song failed to reach the top of the Hot 100, and stalled at number three for a total of three weeks. Additionally, the song peaked at number nine on the Billboard Hot Dance Club Play chart.

Apart from its domestic success, "Love Don't Cost a Thing" topped numerous charts overseas, including Canada, where it became her second number one following "If You Had My Love". It debuted at number nine on the Swiss Singles Chart, and peaked at number two. It was given a Gold certification in Switzerland by the International Federation of the Phonographic Industry, representing sales of more than 20,000 units. In Finland, it debuted at number one, before slowly descending on the charts. In the United Kingdom, the song topped the UK Singles Chart, becoming her first number one there. It was later certified Gold by the British Phonographic Industry, which denotes sales and streams of 400,000 units. In Spain, "Love Don't Cost a Thing" debuted at number one on January 13, 2001. It held this position for two more weeks, and remained in the top ten for a further six weeks. "Love Don't Cost a Thing" also made its debut at number one in Italy, and spent seven weeks in the top ten of the Italian Singles Chart. The song also peaked atop the Romanian and Dutch singles charts.

In Australia, "Love Don't Cost a Thing" debuted and peaked on the ARIA Singles Chart at number four on January 28, 2001. By the end of 2001, it had been certified Platinum by the Australian Recording Industry Association, which certifies shipment of over 70,000 units. On January 14, the song debuted at number 37 in New Zealand, and peaked at number one seven weeks later on March 4, 2001, where it remained for two weeks. "Love Don't Cost a Thing" placed No. 65 on About.com's "Top 100 Best Pop Songs of 2001" list. Additionally, it ranked No. 26 on Billboards Year-End Hot 100 singles of 2001 chart.

Music video

Development and reception 
The music video for "Love Don't Cost a Thing" was shot from November 10–11, 2000 in Miami, Florida, with reshoots on November 20 in Malibu, California following her right ankle injury on the first day. It was directed by Paul Hunter, a frequent collaborator with Lopez, and choreographed by actor and dancer Darrin Dewitt Henson. On December 4, 2000, the making of the video was featured on MTV's Making the Video. The video is famously known for having featured Cris Judd as her back-up dancer. Months after the music video, he would go on to become her second husband. The couple were said to have gotten close to each other during the video shoot, causing media speculation following her highly publicized split from Sean Combs.

Following its release, the clip became an immediate hit on MTV's Total Request Live, which screens popular music videos; it became the most-requested music video on the series at one stage. Throughout 2001, the music video for "Love Don't Cost a Thing" became one of the most-watched clips on the music video programming channels MTV, BET, and VH1. In addition to this, the music video for "Love Don't Cost a Thing" received two nominations at the 2001 MTV Video Music Awards: "Best Female Video" and "Best Dance Video". At the 2002 ALMA Awards, the clip was nominated for the ALMA People's Choice Award for Outstanding Music Video. John Mitchell of MTV News noted that the video continued Lopez's "trend" of "flaunting her men in videos". The music video has been included on Lopez's extended play/DVD, The Reel Me (2003), as well as her greatest hits, Dance Again... the Hits (2012).

Synopsis 
The music video begins with Lopez staying at her boyfriend Reich's mansion. He calls her to tell her that he can't accept their fate, but left her another gold bracelet. Hung up with jewels, she angrily hangs up and leaves. She gets into her Aston Martin convertible and drives out onto the highway. While driving, she throws a gold purse into the air. Lopez stops at a tropical beach and starts taking off her expensive jewelry. Then she takes out the postcard he gave her; and a dance break appears on the screen, in which Lopez is supported by male dancers on a tropical beach. Lopez tears up the postcard, runs to the beach, takes off her pants and frolics in the water, until finally she takes off her tank top and throws it into the camera, remaining all bare and covering her breasts with her hands.

Live performances 
Lopez globally premiered the song on November 16, 2000, at the 7th MTV Europe Music Awards in Stockholm, Sweden. David Basham of MTV News noted that she arrived on-stage in "fly girl fashion via a "prop" plane". On January 12, 2001, she performed the song during an appearance on Top of the Pops. That month, she also performed the song at the 2001 American Music Awards. In February 2001, Lopez performed "Love Don't Cost a Thing" along with "Play" at a special Total Request Live event, CBS Sports Presents: MTV's TRL The Super Bowl Sunday, which occurred in Tampa, Florida at The NFL Experience theme park. Months later, the song was performed at the 2001 MTV Video Music Awards on September 6. From September 22–23, 2001, Lopez performed a set of two concerts in Puerto Rico, entitled Let's Get Loud. These served as the first concerts of her career, in which she was, "flanked by a 10-piece orchestra, a five-person choir and 11 dancers." "Love Don't Cost a Thing" was included on the concerts' set list. In December 2001, Lopez, Kid Rock and Ja Rule headlined a concert for the USO troops in a German military base. Lopez sang "Love Don't Cost a Thing", among other songs. On January 1, 2002, the concert aired as a special on the MTV Network hosted by Carson Daly, For the Troops: An MTV/USO Special. Joe D'Angelo of MTV News noted that she wore "a series of skimpy outfits despite chilly temperatures."

In February 2010, she performed the song at the Sanremo Music Festival in Italy, along with multiple other hits. Soraya Roberts of the New York Daily News commented that her dance moves weren't "highly complicated" because she was restricted by a tight leather catsuit. On October 22, 2011, she performed "Love Don't Cost a Thing" during a special concert which commemorated the 15th anniversary of the Mohegan Sun Arena. The song was included on the set list for her first world tour, 2012's Dance Again World Tour. Elise Vout of the Australian MTV News gave her performance of the song a positive review, "Working her bodacious booty under the lavish firework and pyrotechnic display, she put Kim Kardashian and Nicki Minaj to shame as she performed 'Love Don’t Cost A Thing'."

Lopez performed the track along with several other hits during a July 2013 concert in Hyde Park, London. In March 2014, she sang "Love Don't Cost a Thing" during her concert at the Dubai World Cup. In June of that year, Lopez performed the song during a concert in The Bronx which marked fifteen years since the release of her first album On the 6. Three months later, performed the song again at the 2014 Singapore Grand Prix, as part of a 90-minute set. At her "The Best Is Yet To Come" concert which took place on New Year's Eve 2014 in Caesars Palace, Lopez included "Love Don't Cost a Thing" on her setlist. She later performed the song as part of her medley during the 2018 MTV Video Music Awards on August 20, 2018, at Radio City Music Hall in New York City.

Elements of the song were featured in Lopez's performance during the Super Bowl LIV halftime show.

Accolades

Track listings 

 US maxi-CD and 12-inch single
 "Love Don't Cost a Thing" (HQ2 club vocal mix) – 10:54
 "Love Don't Cost a Thing" (Main Rap 1 featuring Puffy) – 3:36
 "Love Don't Cost a Thing" (RJ Schoolyard mix featuring Fat Joe) – 4:19
 "Love Don't Cost a Thing" (Full Intention club mix) – 7:15
 "Let's Get Loud" (Kung Pow club mix) – 8:08

 US 7-inch single
 "Love Don't Cost a Thing" – 3:50
 "Love Don't Cost a Thing" – 3:50

 UK CD single
 "Love Don't Cost a Thing" – 3:42
 "Love Don't Cost a Thing" (Full Intention remix) – 7:15
 "On the 6 Megamix" – 6:30
 "Love Don't Cost a Thing" (video)

 UK 12-inch single
A1. "Love Don't Cost a Thing" (Full Intention club mix) – 7:15
B1. "Love Don't Cost a Thing" (RJ Schoolyard mix featuring Fat Joe) – 4:19
B2. "Love Don't Cost a Thing" – 3:42

 UK cassette single
 "Love Don't Cost a Thing" – 3:50
 "On the 6 Megamix" – 6:30

 European CD single
 "Love Don't Cost a Thing"
 "Love Don't Cost a Thing" (Full Intention club mix)

 European maxi-CD single ("Amor se paga con amor")
 "Amor se paga con amor (Love Don't Cost a Thing)" (Spanish version)
 "Amor se paga con amor (Love Don't Cost a Thing)" (Spanglish)
 "Amor se paga con amor (Love Don't Cost a Thing)" (alternate Spanglish)
 "Love Don't Cost a Thing" (RJ Schoolyard mix featuring Fat Joe)
 "Love Don't Cost a Thing" (Full Intention club mix)

 French DVD single
 "Love Don't Cost a Thing" – 5:07

 Australian and Japanese CD single
 "Love Don't Cost a Thing"
 "On the 6 Megamix"
 "Love Don't Cost a Thing" (RJ Schoolyard Mix featuring Fat Joe)

Credits and personnel 
Credits taken from the liner notes of J.Lo.

 Damon Sharpe, Georgette Franklin, Jeremy Monroe, Amille D. Harris – songwriters
 Ric Wake – producer, arrangement
 Richie Jones – additional production, arrangement, mixing engineer, programming, drums, percussion
 Cory Rooney – additional production
 Dan Heztel – mixing engineer, vocal producer
 Jim Annunziato – mixing assistant
 Miklos Malek – keyboard programming
 James houston — executive producer
 Greg Lawson – songwriter, additional programming and arrangement
 Peter Wade Keusch – Pro Tools engineer
 Dave Scheuer – vocal producer
 Ronald L. Martinez, David Swope – assistant vocal engineers
 Marc Russell – production assistant
 Ted Jensen – audio mastering

Charts

Weekly charts

Year-end charts

Certifications

Release history

See also
 List of Romanian Top 100 number ones of the 2000s

References

2000 singles
2000 songs
2001 singles
Canadian Singles Chart number-one singles
Dutch Top 40 number-one singles
Epic Records singles
Jennifer Lopez songs
Music videos directed by Paul Hunter (director)
Number-one singles in Finland
Number-one singles in Italy
Number-one singles in the Netherlands
Number-one singles in New Zealand
Number-one singles in Romania
Number-one singles in Spain
SME Records singles
Song recordings produced by Ric Wake
Songs written by Damon Sharpe
Songs written by Greg Lawson
UK Singles Chart number-one singles